Chincoteague High School is a public high school in Accomack County, Virginia. It is one of the four high schools in Accomack County Public Schools. It serves grades six through twelve and, due to its low number of students, has only approximately 40 students per grade. An approximate total of 280 students attend the school. Its mascot, the pony, is named after the feral Chincoteague Ponies on the nearby Assateague Island.

Academics 
CHS is ranked among the top 3,900 public high schools in America, 83rd in Virginia, and 1st in ACPS. CHS offers Advanced Placement (AP) classes to its students, with AP participation being at 38%. The graduation rate is 96%.

References

Chincoteague, Virginia
Public high schools in Virginia
Schools in Accomack County, Virginia
Public middle schools in Virginia